Thomas Hamill may refer to:
 Tomás Hamill, Irish hurler
 Thomas Hamill (bowls)
 Tommy Hamill, Northern Irish footballer